Doña Bárbara is a Venezuelan telenovela written by José Ignacio Cabrujas and produced by RCTV in 1974. It is based on the 1929 novel of the same name written by Rómulo Gallegos.

Marina Baura starred as the titular character with Elio Rubens as Santos, Marisela Berti as Marisela and Carlos Marquez as Balbino.

Cast
 Marina Baura as Doña Bárbara
 Elio Rubens as Santos Luzardo
 Marisela Berti as Marisela Barquero
 Rafael Briceño as Lorenzo Barquero
 Carlos Marquez as Balbino Paiba
 Tomás Henríquez as Melquíades "El Brujeador"
 Juan Fava as El Socio Edmundo Valdemar as Ño Pernalete Enrique Benshimol as Mr. Danger Arturo Calderón as Juan Primito Guillermo González as Bachiller Mujiquita Martha Olivo as Casilda César Lemoine as Asdrúbal Mauricio González as Antonio Sandoval William Moreno as Carmelito Carlos Flores as Melesio Gustavo Rodríguez as María Nieves''

References

External links

1975 telenovelas
RCTV telenovelas
Venezuelan telenovelas
1970s Venezuelan television series
1975 Venezuelan television series debuts
1975 Venezuelan television series endings
Spanish-language telenovelas
Television shows set in Venezuela